Amandinea myrticola is a species of corticolous (bark-dwelling), crustose lichen in the family Caliciaceae. Found in Portugal, it was formally described as a new species in 2011 by Mireia Giralt, Pieter van den Boom, and John Elix. It grows on the smooth bark of Myrtus communis and Pinus twigs. The thallus of the lichen is a smooth to lightly wrinkled grey crust, lacking a prothallus. Amandinea myrticola produces ascospores of the Physconia-type, characterised by a thick septum and median wall thickenings. They are ellipsoid in shape, and typically measure 11–13.5 by 5–6 μm. The lichen does not make any secondary compounds that are detectable with standard chromatographic techniques, and all reactions to standard chemical spot tests are negative.

References

myrticola
Lichen species
Lichens described in 2011
Lichens of Southwestern Europe
Taxa named by John Alan Elix